All The Footprints You've Ever Left And The Fear Expecting Ahead is an album by Japanese Rock Band Envy. It was released in Japan in 2001 by the label H.G. Fact in both CD and LP formats. Originally, the CD also saw a European release on France's Molaire Industries, and was distributed in the US on indie label Dim Mak. The album, along with A Dead Sinking Story, and Compiled Fragments 1997-2003, was re-released in February 2008 by the band's current US label, Temporary Residence Limited.  The album has since been re-released in Europe by Rock Action Records. The album saw a marked change in sound from their previous efforts, and hinted strongly at their current sound.

Track listing

CD/digital

Vinyl LP
Side one

Side two

Some editions include videos for the songs "Left Hand" and "A Cage it Falls Into".

External links
Official Envy page on the Sonzai Records website
Album page at H.G. Fact (Translated from Japanese)

Envy's page on the Temporary Residence Limited site

Envy (band) albums
2001 albums